Barni may refer to the following people:
Given name
Barni Ahmed Qaasim, Somali multimedia artist and filmmaker

Surname
Abha Barni (1874–1938), Princess of Siam, daughter of Gagananga Yukala
 Rambai Barni (1904–1984), Queen of Siam, daughter of Abha
 Roy Barni (1927–1957), American football defensive back